Yakushevskaya is a rural locality (a village) in Zaborskoye Rural Settlement, Tarnogsky District, Vologda Oblast, Russia. The population was 30 as of 2002.

Geography 
Yakushevskaya is located 23 km west of Tarnogsky Gorodok (the district's administrative centre) by road. Goryayevskaya is the nearest rural locality.

References 

Rural localities in Tarnogsky District